Assam Petro-Chemicals Limited is a semi-governmental Indian company with major stakes held by Government of Assam, Oil India Limited and Assam Industrial Development Corporation (AIDC). The company was incorporated in 1971 and by 1976 had started production at their small methanol plant located at Namrup along with formaldehyde and a few urea-formaldehyde resins like urea-formaldehyde glue and urea-formaldehyde moulding powder. Post expansion in 1989 and 1998, the company expanded the methanol plant to the capacity of 100TPD (tonnes per day) and formaldehyde plant to 100TPD. The company announced in September 2017 that it would invest  and expand to produce 500TPD methanol and 200TPD formalin and become the largest producer of methanol in India. The required feedstock for these plants are natural gas, urea and carbon dioxide. Natural gas, supplied by Oil India Ltd, is used as feedstock for methanol production. Urea and carbon dioxide are supplied by BVFCL Fertilizer Plant.

Methanol production
The company is among the top five producers of methanol in India; the other four being Gujarat Narmada Valley Fertilisers & Chemicals, Deepak Fertilisers and Petrochemicals Corporation Limited, Rashtriya Chemicals & Fertilizers and National Fertilizers Limited.

In October 2018, the company started a pilot project to use methanol as cooking gas in place of conventional liquefied petroleum gas (LPG). The company was the first in India to offer methanol as an alternative to traditional cooking fuel. At the launch, the canisters, weighing  each, were priced at  each. Eighteen such canisters of methanol were equivalent to one LPG cylinder which is used for domestic cooking in India. The project was launched in support of NITI Aayog under their concept of "methanol economy" to reduce the cost of importing LPG.

References

External links

1971 establishments in Assam
Chemical companies of India
Chemical companies established in 1971
Companies based in Assam
Indian companies established in 1971
Companies listed on the Bombay Stock Exchange